Huddersfield Rams is an Australian rules football team, based in the West Yorkshire town of Huddersfield, England. They were formed in November 2008 by Karl Haigh, who was introduced to the sport when travelling in Australia.

They have had many players selected to play for England and Great Britain, with founder Karl Haigh captaining England, and former Head Coach Neil Morrison being involved with coaching and scouting for the national team. The Rams are based at the Huddersfield YMCA, where they play all their home games and training sessions.

History

2009: Formation and its first season
The Huddersfield Rams were formed in November 2008 and took part in their first competitive season the following summer. This was preceded by entries into a number of taster tournaments, including the 2009 National Carnival in Newcastle and the 2009 Cardiff Club Challenge. They also competed in the inaugural ARUK Central League with Leeds Bombers, Liverpool Eagles and Birmingham bears.

The Rams were table toppers in their first season and were crowned the 2009 Premiers, beating the Birmingham Bears in the Central League Grand Final by 13.27 (105) – 12.10 (82). During the 2009 Dragon Cup, the team finished the match with the two-legged victory over the Cymru Red Dragons. The season concluded with Karl Haigh and Danny Armitage being selected as players, and Neil Morrison being selected as a coach for the England Dragonslayers team at the 2009 Euro Cup in Croatia. The Dragonslayers won this tournament.

2010–11: Second and third seasons
The second season got off with the Huddersfield Rams as runners-up in the 2010 Haggis Cup in Glasgow, losing narrowly to the Dublin Demons in the final game from 4.6.30 to 3.7.25. However, they followed this up by winning the 2010 National Carnival in Portsmouth, defeating the hosts in the finals. They also won their first game of the regular season against established side Nottingham Scorpions. However, they received three defeats in a row that they came in 3rd place. The season ended with Matt Whiteley and Ally Delooze representing the Great Britain Bulldogs at the 2010 European Championships in Denmark and Sweden. On the other hand, they participated during the 2010 Euro Cup in Milan, Italy.

The Rams kicked off their third season with a strong showing in the 2011 Haggis Cup in Glasgow where they battled through to the semi-finals, but they eventually lost to the Wimbledon Hawks. This was followed by Rams players Danny Armitage and Sam Gill being selected for the European Legion team who played the touring AIS-AFL Academy side at Dulwich College. This game was preceded by the team playing for the Great Britain Bulldogs against Ireland. The regular season saw Huddersfield battle through to the grand finals after its victories against Nottingham Scorpions and Sheffield Thunder. The final was played at Worksop which saw Nottingham Scorpions defeat the Huddersfield Rams in the final game.

The season ended with Matt Whiteley playing for the Great Britain Bulldogs in the 2011 International Cup in Sydney and Melbourne, and the representatives of England Dragonslayers squad who finished third in the 2011 Euro Cup in Belfast, Northern Ireland.

2012: Fourth season
On 17 March, the Rams finished fourth in the pre-season Lightning Cup that was held in Manchester. Later on, Danny Armitage was selected for the European Legion team to once again take on the AIS/AFL academy on 7 April at Surrey Sports Park, Guildford. Club captain Jason Battye was selected for the Great Britain Bulldogs team to take on the Irish Exiles, but both players unfortunately had to pull out due to injury. The team also played in a four team tournament in Italy in June 2012 against the other competing nations Scotland, Italy and Croatia.

The Rams won the Bowl Cup at the 2012 Haggis Cup held in Edinburgh on 21 April, defeating Glasgow Sharks. At the same time, Captain Jason Battye and Luke Booth were awarded places in the Haggis Cup Team of the Tournament. Furthermore, during the Euro Cup in Edinburgh, Booth won a place on the Team of the Tournament, the highest individual honour that a Rams player has received. Booth was also selected to play for the European Islands team against Continental Europe in the AFL game played at The Oval. On the other hand, the Dragonslayers won during their Four Nations tournament victory in Italy, and Matt Whiteley was awarded player of the tournament.

During this time, The Rams already secured a new major club sponsor in Grosvenor Casino Huddersfield. They also took part in a naked calendar shoot for the charity Marie Curie Cancer Research, but it never comes to fruition.

The Rams were qualified for the semi-finals when they beat Leeds Minotaurs in their final regular season game, but Manchester Mosquitoes beat them in the play-off semi-final, bringing their season to an end. In December, The Rams announced that they will be moving home to link up with Huddersfield YMCA Rugby Union Football Club for the 2013 season. To cap off 2012, Five Rams players were announced as members of the initial Great Britain Bulldogs squad list for the 2013 European championships in Ireland. These are: Danny Armitage, Luke Booth, Jason Battye, Graham Bickerdike and Matt Whiteley.

2013: Fifth season
After former head coach Neil Morrison's absence and subsequent return to Australia, club captain Jason Battye became the new head coach for the Rams, a confirmation of the role that he was playing in part during the previous season. Meanwhile, Matt Whiteley continues his role as the assistant coach.

The Rams start a program of developing local talent and recruiting local players by holding two New Player training sessions in Greenhead Park. They also move their home base and operations to the Huddersfield YMCA after four seasons, with Huddersfield Rugby Union Football Club. During this time, Rams players, particularly Graham Bickerdike who receives his first call up to international level, were selected in the initial 75 man squad for the Summer European Cup competition in Dublin, Ireland. The players took part in trial matches against the London Swans and the two-test series against Ireland in Guildford and Dublin in April. They also took part in three preseason matches against Sheffield Thunder, Leeds Minotaurs, and Manchester Mosquitoes.

Although The Rams lose in the semi-final of the Haggis Cup to Wimbledon Hawks by two points, they defeated both the Manchester Mosquitoes and Tyne-Tees Tigers, and narrowly lost to the Edinburgh Bloods, who won the overall Haggis Cup on that day.

Luke Booth was selected for the European Legion squad to face off against the touring AIS/AFL Academy team in the Easter Series at Guildford, making him the third Ram to be involved in the former following Danny Armitage and Sam Gill representation in 2011. In addition, he was selected to play for GB in the 2013 European Championship in Dublin. They defeated Denmark, Germany and Sweden in the group stages, but eventually lost to reigning champions the Irish Warriors in a close final 45–46.

Once again, the Rams participated during the Euro Cup 2013 in France, the inaugural International Series game, and the Movember Cup in Manchester. For the latter, The Rams ended their year with a victorious game by beating the Birmingham Bears and Manchester Mosquitoes in the group stages.

2014: Sixth season
The Rams start the new year with three introductory sessions, two at Greenhead Park and one at Huddersfield YMCA. These were well attended and see the first attendance of school boys from Rastrick High School, reflecting the development that has been going on at the school for the last five years by Jason Battye and Brandon Fletcher. In April, The Rams once again reached the Haggis Cup final in Glasgow, beating Edinburgh, Paris, and Tyne Tees along the way. They eventually fell short by 6 points against Glasgow in the final. Nevertheless, Karl Haigh was voted Haggis Cup Player of the Tournament.

Club symbols
Name & Guernsey
The Huddersfield Rams got its name based on a prominent feature of the Huddersfield town's coat of arms, the woolen trade. On the other hand, the club colours of blue and white with a gold trim are linked with other prominent sporting clubs in Huddersfield. The club founder Karl Haigh describes: "I got the idea for the team name from our Huddersfield coat of arms which is Three Rams, and our colours are closely associated with our soccer club but also contain the gold of both our league and union rugby teams."

Logo
The original club logo was selected by ARUK's Brian Clarke, which was the emblem used by the St. Louis Rams American Football team. This logo appeared on the club's first shirts. A subsequent desire for their own identity lead the club to release "Rambo" for the 2011 season. "Rambo" now adorns its Guernseys and its head is the current club's logo.

Home grounds
When it started in 2008, The Huddersfield Rams was based at the Lockwood Park Sports Complex, the home of the Huddersfield Rugby Union Football Club. However, they moved to the Huddersfield YMCA Sports Complex since the start of the 2013 season to train and play home games and matches.

Finals record

Season statistical summary

Historical positions

International players
The following are the list of players who played in major competitions.

European

 Danny Armitage (European Legion v AIS/AFL 2011)
 Luke Booth (European Islands v Continental Europe 2012, European Legion v AIS/AFL 2013)
 Sam Gill (European Legion v AIS/AFL 2011)

Great Britain Bulldogs

 Graham Bickerdike (European Championships 2013)
 Luke Booth (European Championships 2013)
 Ally Delooze (European Championships 2010)
 Matt Whiteley (European Championships 2010, International Cup 2011)

England Dragonslayers

 Danny Armitage (Euro Cup 2009– Winners, 2011)
 Jason Battye (Euro Cup 2010, 2011)
 Graham Bickerdike (Euro Cup 2013– Winners)
 Luke Booth (Euro Cup 2012 Team of the Tournament, 2013– Winners)
 Ally Delooze (Euro Cup 2010, 2011)
 Karl Haigh (Euro Cup 2009– Winners, 2010)
 Matt Whiteley (Euro Cup 2010, 2011, 2012, 2013– Winners)

International coaches

 Karl Haigh (AIS/AFL 2010)
 Neil Morrison (Euro Cup 2009, 2010)

Club sponsors
The first main club sponsor for the Rams was Easi Lift Loading Systems. Their logo appeared on the players' on-and-off field clothing. In 2012, Grosvenor Casino Huddersfield became the club's main sponsor.

Honours
Domestic League – Premiers: 2009 (ARUK Central Division); Runners-up: 2011 (Central and North West League), 2014 (Central and North League)
National Carnival – Premiers: 2010
Haggis Cup – Runners-up: 2010, 2014; Semi-Finalists: 2011, 2013, Bowl Winners: 2012
Movember Cup – Premiers: 2013

See also

References

External links
Huddersfield Rams Official club website

Sports clubs in Huddersfield
Australian rules football clubs in England
2008 establishments in England
Australian rules football clubs established in 2008